Brian William “Dunny” Dunseth (born March 2, 1977) is an American television soccer commentator and former player.

Career

College 
Dunseth played college soccer at California State University, Fullerton, and was one of the first players to sign a Project-40 contract, in 1997.

Professional 
He was assigned to the New England Revolution and spent the next four and a half seasons there, before being traded to the Miami Fusion midway through 2001. The Fusion was contracted next year, and Dunseth was taken by the Columbus Crew in the 2002 MLS Dispersal Draft and spent a year and a half there, before a trade to the Dallas Burn.

Dunseth left Major League Soccer for 2004, playing for Bodens BK in Sweden. He was elected Best Player of the Norrbotten County that season by a major newspaper. He then returned to MLS, signing with Real Salt Lake. He played a year with the club, before a trade to Chivas USA for Douglas Sequeira and Christian Jimenez. Before the 2006 season started, Dunseth was traded again, to the Los Angeles Galaxy for a draft pick. In process, he became the first MLS player to be on the roster of seven different teams (although he never played for Chivas). He was waived by the Galaxy in May 2006. In eight years of MLS, Dunseth scored five goals and six assists. He retired from professional soccer in July 2006.

He played for Los Angeles-based amateur team Hollywood United in the 2008 Lamar Hunt U.S. Open Cup

International
Dunseth was captain of the U.S. team that competed at the 2000 Summer Olympics and 1997 World Youth Championship.

Personal life
Along with college teammate Ben Hooper and Ace Harrison, Dunseth co-owns a fashion line called Bumpy Pitch and The Original Winger, a soccer-specific lifestyle website.

Sportscasting
After retiring from his professional soccer career, Dunseth worked as a sportscaster for Real Salt Lake. He frequently contributed to various MLS partners for commentary while still working for RSL. He was named one of the commentators for Apple TV's MLS coverage in 2023.

Honors

Club
Columbus Crew
Lamar Hunt U.S. Open Cup: 2002

References

1977 births
Living people
American soccer players
American expatriate soccer players
Bodens BK players
Cal State Fullerton Titans men's soccer players
Columbus Crew players
FC Dallas players
Hollywood United players
Miami Fusion players
New England Revolution players
Olympic soccer players of the United States
People from Upland, California
Soccer players from California
Footballers at the 2000 Summer Olympics
Real Salt Lake players
LA Galaxy players
Major League Soccer players
United States men's under-20 international soccer players
United States men's under-23 international soccer players
MLS Pro-40 players
A-League (1995–2004) players
1998 CONCACAF Gold Cup players
Major League Soccer broadcasters
Association football defenders